Tommaso Mancini (born 23 July 2004) is an Italian professional footballer who plays as a center-forward for  club Juventus Next Gen.

Club career
Born in Vicenza, Mancini progressed through the youth ranks at the city's main club, where he signed his first professional contract in July 2020, penning a three-year deal. In the meantime, the forward also started training with the first team, under manager Domenico Di Carlo, and featured for Lega Pro's under-15 national team.

On 30 September 2020, Mancini made his senior debut for Vicenza, playing the first half of the Coppa Italia game against Pro Patria, which ended in a 3–2 win after extra time for his side. At 16 years and 67 days, he became the club's second youngest player ever, behind only Nicola Rigoni (who had debuted at 16 years and 60 days). On 4 January 2021, the forward made his league debut, coming in as a substitute for Stefano Giacomelli at the 80th minute of the Serie B match against Brescia, which ended in a 3–0 away win for his team. At 16 years and 162 days, he became the youngest player to ever feature in a Serie B match. Throughout the season, Mancini made four more senior appearances, including a start. In the following campaign, the forward saw his playing time limited by injuries and tactical decisions: in the end, he gained a total amount of nine senior appearances, as Vicenza eventually faced relegation from the second tier.

In the summer of 2022, Mancini attracted interest by several high-profile Italian and European teams: after starting the pre-season at Vicenza, and failing to agree personal terms with AC Milan, he eventually joined Juventus on a permanent deal, with the estimated transfer fee being between €2 million and €2.5 million.

Mancini was initially assigned to the club's under-19 squad, where he impressed with his performances in the Campionato Primavera and the UEFA Youth League. On 7 December 2022, the center-forward made his debut for Juventus Next Gen, coming in as a substitute in the second half of the Coppa Italia Serie C match against Padova.

International career
Mancini has represented Italy at various youth international levels.

After featuring for the under-15 national team for the first time in March 2019, he went on to play for the under-16, under-18 and under-19 national teams in the following years.

The forward was included in the under-18 squad that took part in the 2022 Mediterranean Games in Oran, as the Azzurrini eventually won the silver medal after losing to France (1–0) in the tournament's final match. 

Both in May and December 2022, he took part in training camps at Coverciano with the Italian senior national team, led by the head coach Roberto Mancini.

Style of play 
Mancini has been described as a complete center-forward, who can play either as a standalone target man or in an attacking duo. Despite being naturally right-footed, he can also use his left foot as effectively. Thanks to his height and his physique, he excels in heading and defending possession: however, he can also take on his opponent with his technical skills and his athleticism. Moreover, he has been regarded for his coordination, his off-the-ball movement and his finishing prowess, which provide him with a wide variety of options to find the net through, including acrobatic strikes and free kicks.

Due to his characteristics, he has been compared to Zlatan Ibrahimović.

Career statistics

Club

References

External links
 
 

2004 births
Living people
Sportspeople from Vicenza
Footballers from Veneto
Italian footballers
Association football forwards
L.R. Vicenza players
Juventus F.C. players
Juventus Next Gen players
Serie B players
Serie C players
Italy youth international footballers
Competitors at the 2022 Mediterranean Games
Mediterranean Games silver medalists for Italy
Mediterranean Games medalists in football